Island City is an unincorporated community located in Owsley County, Kentucky, United States. Island City is located at the junction of KY 1503 and KY 1350.

References

Unincorporated communities in Owsley County, Kentucky
Unincorporated communities in Kentucky